Hercules Against the Barbarians is a 1964 Italian peplum film directed by Domenico Paolella. 

When the Mongols invade Europe, they are defeated at Krakow for the first time after many victories. Kubilai (Ken Clark), the responsible commander, asks his emperor Genghis Khan for a second chance. Kubilai has two ideas how to avoid another defeat. First, he wants to eliminate Maciste (aka Hercules in the American dubbed version), the hero of the Polish people, played by Mark Forest. And then, Kubilai holds a prisoner who reveals an important secret: the princess and future queen of Poland lives in a village under false identity. The Mongols want to capture her, but of course, Maciste is a guardian to any maiden in distress...

Cast 
 Mark Forest as Hercules / Maciste
 José Greci as Arminia
 Ken Clark as Kubilai
 Gloria Milland as Arias
 Roldano Lupi as Genghis Khan
 Howard Ross as Gason 
 Mirko Ellis as King Vladimir 
 Bruno Scipioni

Release
Hercules Against the Barbarians was released in Italy on 16 April 1964.

Reception
Film critic Howard Hughes objected a lack of "logic and history".

References

Bibliography

External links
 
 
 Hercules Against the Barbarians at Variety Distribution

1964 films
Films directed by Domenico Paolella
Films scored by Carlo Savina
Peplum films
1960s adventure films
Films set in the 13th century
Maciste films
Depictions of Genghis Khan on film
Sword and sandal films
1960s Italian films